Christian "Ian" Perez (born 17 January 1982) is a Filipino professional darts player.

Career
In October 2009, Perez reached the final of the Shanghai International Darts Open, losing 10–4 to John Part. He later qualified for the 2010 PDC World Darts Championship where he defeated Denmark's Per Laursen 4–3 in the preliminary round. In the first round against Robert Thornton, Perez won the first set, but eventually lost 3–1.

Perez again qualified for the PDC World Championship in 2012 after defeating Bobong Gabiana in the final of the Philippines qualifier. He won through the preliminary round where he beat Dietmar Burger 4 legs to 0, setting up a first round match with Alan Tabern, which he then lost 3 sets to 1 on the same day.

Perez represented the Philippines with Lourence Ilagan in the 2012 PDC World Cup of Darts and  together they were beaten 5–3 by the United States in the first round. In December he lost in the final of the Soft Tip World Championship to Takehiro Suzuki of Japan. He was due to play with Ilagan once more in the 2013 World Cup of Darts but they were forced to withdraw due to travel problems. In October, he won the third Soft Tip Dartslive event in Hong King by seeing off Ilagan in the final. Perez progressed to the final of the Grand Final for the second year in a row where Ilagan exacted revenge by defeating him 4–1.

In September 2014, Perez won the South Asian Qualifier for the 2015 World Championship with a 5–2 victory over Bryan Eribal. He played Spain's Cristo Reyes in the preliminary round and was whitewashed 4–0.

In January 2023, he took part in the PDC Q-School qualifying tournament. On the fourth day of the tournament finals, he obtained a PDC Tour Card for the next two years.

World Championship results

PDC
 2010: First round (lost to Robert Thornton 1–3)
 2012: First round (lost to Alan Tabern 1–3)
 2015: Preliminary round (lost to Cristo Reyes 0–4 in legs)
 2023: First round (lost to Simon Whitlock 2–3)

References

External links

Filipino darts players
Living people
1982 births
Professional Darts Corporation current tour card holders
Sportspeople from South Cotabato
PDC World Cup of Darts Filipino team